Farbo Glacier is a tributary glacier which drains northeastward and enters the Land Glacier  west of Mount McCoy, on the coast of Marie Byrd Land, Antarctica. It was mapped by the United States Geological Survey from surveys and U.S. Navy aerial photographs, 1959–65, and was named by the Advisory Committee on Antarctic Names for Richard R. Farbo, a U.S. Navy equipment operator who wintered-over in Antarctica on three expeditions of Operation Deep Freeze. He was at McMurdo Station in 1959 and 1965, and the South Pole Station in 1969.

References 

Glaciers of Marie Byrd Land